The Last Mitterrand (French title: Le Promeneur du Champ de Mars) is a 2005 film directed by Robert Guédiguian depicting the final period in the life of an unnamed French President (but the English title suggests the president is François Mitterrand).  The film is based on the book Le Dernier Mitterrand by Georges-Marc Benamou.

Benamou had talked with and accompanied Mitterrand for the last 1,000 days of his presidency.
Benamou worked for a small circulation magazine called Globe - a magazine for champagne socialists- la gauche caviar in the French idiom. It is not clear why Mitterrand chose Benamou but the journalist has said they got on well and discussed life, women and literature.

When the resulting book appeared in 1997 however, Benamou was turned upon by many of Mitterrand's family and associates - even Pierre Bergé, who financed the Globe  magazine called it a work of "absolute treachery" - and they would not help with the film. It seems they were particularly outraged not by revelations about Mitterrand's private life,-Mitterrand had a secret second family including the daughter he kept hidden from the public- or anything to do with Vichy, but with a description of Mitterrand devouring a plateful of ortolans. The bird is a protected species and eating them forbidden under EU law.  Certain other people at the dinner called Benamou a liar saying this incident never happened. Benamou denied this. In 2004 one of Mitterrand's closest associates, who had also been at the meal said Benamou was right but no ortolans appear in the film and Mitterrand eats a plate of oysters. Benamou, an Algerian born Sephardic Jew, asserted that he had not found Mitterrand anti-semitic either in his time in Vichy or afterwards,  - something that Mitterrand, who sometimes spoke of 'le lobby juif', his term for some French Jews' and their focus on his wartime record - had been accused of. Benamou defended Mitterrand in spite of his protection of collaborators like René Bousquet and Maurice Papon - "Papon became a minister under Giscard d'Estaing; he was chief of police under de Gaulle. This is not a secret of Mitterrand [but of] the French bourgeoisie and Mitterrand was an emblem of that."

The film won a César award for Michel Bouquet in his role as Mitterrand.

References

External links

Review in The Guardian

2005 films
Films set in Paris
Films directed by Robert Guédiguian
French drama films
2005 drama films
French political films
The Last Mitterrand
2000s French films